A. M. H. Nazeem is the Member of the Legislative Assembly for the Karaikal South constituency and a former health minister and opposition leader of Puducherry union territory in India.

Personal information
He is the son of Hameed Maraicaiar. His age is 59. He is a member of Dravida Munnetra Kazhagam (DMK).

Career
Nazeem's political career started in the year 1983. In 1990, he was elected to the Puducherry Assembly from Karaikal North in 1991, 1996, 2001 and 2006. In 1996, when DMK was in power, he became the health minister. In 2006, he was the opposition leader. In 2011, Nazeem once again became MLA, contesting in the newly created Karaikal South constituency, defeating V.K.Ganapathy by nearly 1500 votes. He was defeated by K. A. U. Asana in the 2016 election by 20 votes, after many alliance party workers worked against him. In 2021 elections, Nazeem defeated his rival K.A.U. Asana, by scoring 71.15% votes.

Developments in Karaikal under his career
Nazeem is the MLA who helped with the re-construction of Chandra Theertham temple tank. He is responsible for the festival of theppam in the Chandra Theertham temple tank after 30 years. He helped to construct and celebrate the Karaikal chariot festival. He also played a prominent role in getting JIPMER's branch in Karaikal, NIT and construction of the fishing harbour.

References 

Year of birth missing (living people)
Living people
People from Karaikal district
Puducherry politicians
Puducherry MLAs 2021–2026